The caper elimia, scientific name Elimia olivula, is a species of gilled freshwater snails with an operculum, aquatic gastropod mollusks in the family Pleuroceridae. This species is endemic to the United States.

References

Molluscs of the United States
Elimia
Gastropods described in 1834
Taxa named by Timothy Abbott Conrad
Taxonomy articles created by Polbot